The 2010 United Nations Security Council election was held on 12 October 2010 during the 65th session of the United Nations General Assembly, held at United Nations Headquarters in New York City. The elections were for five non-permanent seats on the UN Security Council for two-year mandates commencing on  2011. The General Assembly elected Colombia, Germany, India, Portugal, and South Africa.

Procedure

In accordance with the Security Council's rotation rules, whereby the ten non-permanent UNSC seats rotate among the various regional blocs into which UN member states traditionally divide themselves for voting and representation purposes, the five available seats are allocated as follows:

One for Africa (held by Uganda)
One for Asia (held by Japan)
One for Latin America (held by Mexico)
Two for the Western European and Others Group (held by Austria and Turkey)

Term
The five members will serve on the Security Council for the 2011–12 period.

For the WEOG seats Germany, along with Canada, and Portugal, stood for election. India ran uncontested for the Asian seat since Kazakhstan stood aside. South Africa also ran uncontested for the African seat after being endorsed by the African Union. After dropping out to Brazil in the 2009 election, Colombia also ran unopposed.

Elected members
Africa: South Africa replaces Uganda
Asia: India replaces Japan
GRULAC: Colombia replaces Mexico
WEOG: Germany and Portugal replace Austria and Turkey

Results
The results in the three uncontested seats were as follows: India received 187 votes, South Africa 182 votes and Colombia 186 votes.

For the two Western European and Others Seats the results were as follows:

Round 1
Germany 128
Portugal 121
Canada 114
Germany was elected as they passed the two-thirds majority.

Round 2
Portugal 113
Canada 78
Following this round of voting Canada officially withdrew its candidacy.

Round 3
Portugal 150
Canada 32

Some states continued to vote for Canada, as withdrawal of candidacy is not binding and member states may vote for any state they please. However, the withdrawal was sufficient to ensure the election of Portugal by a two-thirds majority.

Reactions

Canada
Canadian Foreign Minister Lawrence Cannon acknowledged that foreign policy under the Conservative government had played a role in the loss – even as he said that policy is based on sound democratic and human rights principles. "We will not back down from our principles that form the basis of our great country, and we will continue to pursue them on the international stage," Cannon said. "Some would even say that, because of our attachment to those values, we lost a seat on the council. If that's the case, then so be it." Blame was also shifted toward Liberal Party of Canada leader Michael Ignatieff  for the defeat by the Conservative Party of Canada, though he rejected the blame as "ridiculous". "The blame game is a sign of a government that is unwilling to absorb the lessons of defeat." He, along with his foreign affairs critic Bob Rae, also said Prime Minister Stephen Harper had "paid the price" for a change in the foreign relations of Canada away from the traditional path of the Liberal and Progressive Conservative governments since the second half of the twentieth century. They cited Canada's tradition of peacekeeping missions, a balance in policies toward Israel and Palestine, aid and economic links with Africa and multilateral work on the environment and other global issues. One former diplomat said "We've suffered a loss that we haven't previously suffered in our foreign policy. It is a significant defeat for Canadian policy. We presented ourselves for a seat and the membership found us inadequate."

In a December 2011 interview, Canada's new foreign affairs minister John Baird attributed the failure to win a seat to principled positions taken by Canada on certain international issues: “Maybe if we had shut up, and not talked about gay rights in Africa; maybe if we had shut up and been more quiet about our concerns about Sri Lanka; maybe if we hadn't been so vocally against the deplorable human rights record in Iran, maybe Iran might have voted for us.... But we didn't and I don't think we regret anything. Iran probably voted against us; North Korea probably voted against us; Gadhafi probably voted against us. I think those are all badges of honour.”

India
India's envoy to the UN, Hardeep Singh Puri said "We have worked hard ... we have pushed for every single vote".

See also
List of members of the United Nations Security Council
Canada and the United Nations
Germany and the United Nations
India and the United Nations
European Union and the United Nations

References

External links
 UN document A/65/PV.28 (Official record of proceedings)
 UN document GA/11009 (UN Department of Public Information)
 Report from official UN YouTube channel
 UN News Centre
 Press Conference on Rules of Procedure for Security Council Elections (11 October 2010)

2010 elections
2010
2010 in international relations
Non-partisan elections
October 2010 events